"Runaway" is a song by Colombian singer Sebastián Yatra, Puerto Rican rapper and singer Daddy Yankee, and Dominican singer Natti Natasha featuring vocals from American group Jonas Brothers. It was released as a single on June 21, 2019. The song reached number one in Ecuador, El Salvador, Nicaragua, Panama and Peru. In October, it reached the number one position on the Latin Airplay chart.

Background
On June 21, 2019, Yatra, Yankee, and Natasha released the track "Runaway", featuring the Jonas Brothers. "Runaway" is the first bilingual song Yatra has released. After writing the chorus in English, Yatra realized that he wanted a mainstream English-language musician to feature on the track, putting the recording of the song on hold for two years while he searched for the right collaborators. Commenting on the song, Yatra stated, "you feel the happiness in the track."

Promotion
All the artists along with Jonas Brothers members Nick, Joe, and Kevin revealed the track on social media on June 14, 2019, also sharing the cover art.

Music video
The music video was released alongside the single. It was directed by Daniel Duran and filmed in New York City, starring all artists. The video has over 352 million views on YouTube as of December 2021.

Live performance
It has been performed live on the Jonas Brothers' Happiness Begins Tour for the first time on August 7, 2019, the first tour date.
On November 8, 2019, the brothers performed the song along their singles "Sucker" and "Only Human" during the LOS40 Music Awards 2019. On the same date, they released their new holiday song, "Like It's Christmas".

Charts

Weekly charts

Year-end charts

Certifications

See also
List of Billboard Hot Latin Songs and Latin Airplay number ones of 2019

References

2019 singles
2019 songs
Daddy Yankee songs
Jonas Brothers songs
Natti Natasha songs
Sebastián Yatra songs
Spanish-language songs
Songs written by Daddy Yankee
Songs written by Joe Jonas
Songs written by Nick Jonas
Songs written by Kevin Jonas
Songs written by Andrés Torres (producer)
Song recordings produced by Andrés Torres (producer)
Songs written by Sebastián Yatra